National routes in South Africa are a class of trunk roads and freeways which connect major cities. They form the highest category in the South African route numbering scheme, and are designated with route numbers beginning with "N", from N1 to N18. Most segments of the national route network are officially proclaimed National Roads that are maintained by the South African National Roads Agency (SANRAL), but some segments are maintained by provincial or local road authorities.

The system was mostly built during the 1970s by the National Party government of South Africa, although construction of new roads and repairs of existing stretches continue today. The system was modeled on the United States Interstate Highway network, an idea first brought into effect by US President Dwight D. Eisenhower during the 1950s, based on the German Autobahn, which he experienced when touring Germany after the Second World War.

Although the terms National Road and National Route are sometimes regarded as synonymous, they have distinct meanings, and not all national routes are National Roads, while some "R"-numbered routes are proclaimed National Roads.

Definition
National routes are defined and numbered by the Route Numbering and Road Traffic Signs Sub Committee within the Roads Co-ordinating Body, an organisation which contains representatives from road authorities in national, provincial and local government. The term "national road" is frequently used to refer to a national route, but technically a "national road" is any road maintained by the South African National Roads Agency (SANRAL) and need not necessarily form part of a national route, and there are "R" routes that are proclaimed National Roads. There are also road segments of the national route network that are maintained by provincial or local authorities rather than SANRAL, and are thus not National Roads.

Table of routes
National Routes are denoted with the letter N followed by a number indicating the specific route. On maps and some signage, national routes are shown by a pentagon with the number of the road inside. There are fifteen declared national routes, which are listed below.

Earlier scheme 

An earlier scheme, deviating considerably from the current numbering, is described in the 1970 Shell Road Atlas of South Africa and other contemporaneous sources:
N1 - equivalent to the current N9 from George to Colesberg, and then the current N1 from there to Beitbridge (with deviations as some newer parts had yet to be built)
N2 - equivalent to the section of the current N2 from Cape Town to Durban
N3 - equivalent to the current N3 from Durban to Ladysmith, then following the current N11 to Volksrust, and the current R23 from there to Heidelberg, and then continuing equivalent to the N3 until its end in Johannesburg
N4 - equivalent to the section of the current N4 from Pretoria to Komatipoort
N5 - equivalent to the current N5 but from Winburg past Harrismith to Ladysmith (the latter part now signed as the N3)
N6 - equivalent to the current N6, except that it begins from King William's Town, the section from there to Stutterheim now being the R346, and ending in Reddersburg.
N7 - equivalent to the section of the current N10 from Ncanaha to just past Middelburg
N8 - equivalent to the section of the current R64 from Kimberley to Bloemfontein
N9 - equivalent to the section of the current N1 from Cape Town to Colesberg
N10 - equivalent to the section of the current R56 between Kokstad and Pietermaritzburg
N11 - equivalent to the current N7
N12 - equivalent to the section of the current N12 from George to Beaufort West
N13 - equivalent to the section of the current N12 from Three Sisters to Johannesburg
N14 - equivalent to the section of the current N2 from Durban to Eswatini
N15 - equivalent to the section of the current R75 from Port Elizabeth to Uitenhage
N16 - equivalent to the section of the current N3 between Heidelberg and Harrismith
N17 - equivalent to the section of the current N10 between Noupoort and Namibia
N18 - equivalent to the section of the current R61 from Queenstown to Port St. Johns
N19 - equivalent to the section of the current R56 from south of Jamestown to Kokstad

See also 
 Provincial routes (South Africa)
 Regional routes (South Africa)
 Johannesburg Freeways
 Durban Transportation
 Trans-African Highway network

Notes

External links 
 South African National Roads Agency
 The Peninsula Expressway

 
South Africa